Overpressure ammunition, commonly designated as +P or +P+, is small arms ammunition that has been loaded to produce a higher internal pressure when fired than is standard for ammunition of its caliber (see internal ballistics), but less than the pressures generated by a proof round.  This is done typically to produce rounds with a higher muzzle velocity and stopping power, such as ammunition used for defensive or hunting purposes.  Because of this, +P ammunition is typically found in handgun calibers which might be used for defensive purposes.

+P vs. magnum cartridges
Magnum cartridges, such as the .357 Magnum, are usually developed by greatly increasing the working pressure of an existing cartridge, and the resulting cartridges are typically different in some small manner to prevent them from being chambered in firearms not specifically designed for them. For example, the .357 Magnum is slightly longer than the .38 Special, which is the parent cartridge of lower pressure from which it was derived. +P ammunition, however, is externally identical to standard ammunition of its caliber. +P ammunition is not recommended to be used in firearms of questionable quality or in a state of disrepair. Usually because the extra chamber pressure may cause hazards or malfunctions.

History
The burning characteristics of black powder used in early cartridges meant that these cartridges operated at low pressures, generally under ~25,000 psi. These cartridges were limited by their case capacity, and the only way to get more power was to increase the case dimensions to hold more powder; this can be seen in firearms such as those made by Sharps Rifle Manufacturing Company, which made rifles with nominal powder capacities from 70 grains (.45-70) to 110 grains (.45-110).

With the advent of smokeless powder, which has a far greater energy density than black powder, it was possible to generate far more power in the large cases of the older black-powder cartridges.  Cartridges such as the .32-20 Winchester and .44-40 Winchester were chambered in both revolvers and lever action rifles, and the rifles' actions could handle much higher pressures.  This led to "machine gun only" loads in these calibers, which provided far more velocity and energy in the rifles, but were not safe in the revolvers due to the higher pressures they generated.  These loads were eventually dropped due to a combination of safety concerns, and new smokeless rifle cartridges that offered even higher velocities, such as the .30-30 Winchester.

The first modern smokeless powder cartridge deliberately loaded by a major manufacturer to higher than standard pressure was the .38 ACP, originally introduced in 1900.  This cartridge provided performance similar to other .38 caliber cartridges of the time.  However, in 1929 the cartridge was redesigned as the .38 Super Automatic, or just .38 Super, along with a significant increase in operating pressure and muzzle energy, making it the most powerful auto pistol cartridge available, in both energy and velocity, for many years. Like the "rifle only" loads, the .38 Super could still be chambered in the older .38 ACP guns, producing a dangerous combination.  Capable of reaching a muzzle energy of 500 ft-lbs, the .38 Super remains a viable defensive cartridge, though it is most popular in shooting sports such as IPSC.  A similar move to a high pressure loading was done on the .38 Special in 1930, producing the .38-44 HV loadings, and eventually leading to the development and production of the .357 Magnum in 1935.

Standards
In the United States, standards related to arms and ammunition are maintained and published by the Sporting Arms and Ammunition Manufacturers' Institute (SAAMI), which publishes standard internal pressures of calibers, formerly measured in copper units of pressure and currently in psi based on piezoelectric instrumentation. Official +P pressures are established by the SAAMI for certain cartridges; in general the +P pressure is approximately 10% higher than the standard pressure (see chart below). SAAMI does not have a +P+ pressure standard, but this indicates a pressure higher than the +P loading, approximately 25% higher than the standard pressure. In both cases this is below the pressure of a proof test cartridge. Proof pressures are established by the SAAMI, as a percentage of the working pressure, so this places an upper bound on the +P+ pressures of 30–40%. By way of comparison, magnum calibers may be loaded to nearly twice the pressure of the rounds from which they were derived. Overpressure rounds are commonly defensive rounds and are loaded by police and others in need of maximum power in a compact firearm. Accordingly, most overpressure rounds are hollow points or other types of expanding ammunition.

"Higher pressure" is not the same as "high pressure"; +P cartridges are generally loaded to pressures far below those typically found in magnum cartridges. The +P standard is designed so that if a shooter were to accidentally use a +P cartridge in a non +P rated firearm, the chance of a one-time explosive failure is minimal as long as the gun was in good physical condition. Repeated firing of +P ammunition in a gun not rated for it will drastically speed mechanical failure of the gun, however, and so it should only be used in firearms designated by the manufacturer as safe for +P use.

Commercially available +P cartridges
Cartridges that are commonly improved with +P pressures are the 9mm Parabellum, .38 Special, .45 ACP, .38 ACP, and .257 Roberts which are all cartridges that date from the late 19th and the early 20th century.  There has been significant improvement in metallurgy and quality since the first guns in those calibers have been made, with the result that higher pressures are now safe in modern firearms.  Many models will specify the degree to which they can use +P ammunition; for example, many aluminum alloy framed .38 Special revolvers should not regularly be used with +P ammunition, for while the cylinder is capable of withstanding the pressures, the added force will increase wear and reduce the service life of the gun.

SAAMI specifications for common +P cartridges are as follows:

The +P+ designation is not currently used by SAAMI, but is used by some manufacturers to designate loads that exceed the +P SAAMI specifications. One source lists the 9×19mm +P+ loading as having a pressure of 42,000 psi, a 20% increase over the standard pressure of 35,000 psi, and the .38 Special +P+ as 22,000 psi, a 25.71% increase over the standard pressure of 17,500 psi.

Small ammunition makers and reloading guides will often include special loads for specific purposes, such as the below listed .45 Colt load from Buffalo Bore Ammunition.  These loads are generally designed to provide maximum performance from older cartridges, when used in newer, stronger firearms.  The 14,000 psi limit for .45 Colt, for example, reflects the black powder performance of the round, and is safe even in firearms built in 1873, when the cartridge was introduced.  Using modern, solid head brass in a Ruger Blackhawk revolver, a similar design originally chambered in the high pressure .44 Magnum, the pressure can be pushed far higher with no ill effects.  However, since these loads, with nearly double the pressure, could destroy a firearm intended for black powder level loads, they are less commonly encountered.

Custom and handloaded overpressure cartridges
Some older cartridges, especially those that were originally black-powder cartridges, such as the .45 Colt (1873) and .45-70 (1873), are capable of being loaded to far higher levels than was originally possible.  Because modern firearms are much stronger than the original black powder era firearms (for example, many .45 Colt guns are built on the same frame as .44 Magnum versions) a combination of modern firearm and specially loaded ammunition can provide performance to rival modern cartridges.  However, these high-pressure loading can only be used in modern firearms.  Because of the potential danger in shooting these "unofficial magnum" cartridges, they are generally only available if handloaded or purchased from low-volume specialty manufacturers.  SAAMI specifications may or may not exist for these loads, so extra caution must be used.  Generally, the manufacturer or data publisher will specify exactly which makes and/or models of firearm can or cannot be safely used with a given load, such as "Only for use in Ruger and Thompson/Center Contenders", "Use only in modern Marlin and Winchester repeating actions" or "Ruger No. 1 and No. 3".

In many cases, these loads are not pressure tested, but are tested by firing in particular firearms, then checked for signs of excessive pressure.  In some cases, high pressure ammunition is restricted to law enforcement sales, such as Federal's .38 Special +P+ and 9mm Parabellum +P+ Hydra-Shok cartridges.   The following table lists some non-SAAMI +P loads for which the manufacturer publishes pressure information.

+P ammunition use
Unless the firearm is explicitly marked as being +P rated or it is clearly stated in the gun's manual, +P ammunition should not be used.  If in doubt, a check by a gunsmith or contacting the gun's manufacturer will verify the safety of +P ammunition in a particular firearm.  Ammunition that is loaded to +P pressures is clearly marked on the headstamp as such, for example a 9mm would be marked "9mm Parabellum +P".

The use of +P or +P+ ammunition does accelerate wear and reduces the service life on the component parts on any pistol.
In addition to questions of safety and durability are issues of reliability and usability.  Since +P cartridges may generate a significantly different quality of recoil, this can affect firearm function.  For example, recoil operated firearms may fail to function if the velocity of the recoiling parts is too high; in lightweight revolvers, the cartridge case may recoil away from the bullet with sufficient force to overcome the crimp, allowing the bullet to move forward in the cylinder and causing the cylinder to bind. The increased velocities and pressures of a +P loading will increase muzzle blast and recoil, and may prove difficult to handle for many shooters; these problems are exacerbated by compact, lightweight guns with short barrels.

+P ammunition and velocity
In general, the purpose of a +P cartridge is to get a higher velocity for a given bullet weight than a standard pressure cartridge.  However, the pressure rating used to determine if a round is +P is the peak pressure, which is not an accurate indication of the velocity, since it is the area under the pressure curve that determines the total energy imparted to the bullet (see internal ballistics).  A large number of factors can impact the peak pressure of a load, such as:
Bullet weight
Bullet seating depth, which is a factor of
Bullet material
Bullet shape
Bullet diameter
Test barrel diameter
Test barrel chamber shape
Bullet hardness
Friction in bore
Crimp strength
Smokeless powder burn rate
Primer strength
Cartridge case volume
Because of these factors, it is possible to have two loads where each is propelling the same bullet weight at the same velocity, but one is a standard pressure load and one is a +P load.  Even in the same firearm, with the same components, cartridges with low powder capacity and high operating pressures, such as the .40 S&W, have been shown to have a significant increase in pressure with very minor differences in bullet seating depth.  One example in .40 S&W demonstrated a 20% pressure increase with a 0.05 inch (1.2 mm) change in seating depth.

References

Demystifying +P, Handguns Magazine
SAAMI pressure chart

Ammunition